Dongguan (560) is a Type 053H1G (Jianghu-V) frigate of the People's Liberation Army Navy.

The frigate is based at Mischief Reef, 76 nautical miles from Half Moon Shoal, Spratly Islands in South China Sea. On 25 February 2011 she was involved in a confrontation in Jackson Atoll with three fishing boats from the Philippines. She ran aground on Half Moon Shoal on 11 July 2012.

See also
 Spratly Islands dispute

References

Frigates of the People's Liberation Army Navy